Yao Yecheng (26 August 1887 – 1966), along with Chen Jieru ("Jennie", 1906–1971) was among the two concubines of Nationalist Chinese leader Chiang Kai-shek (1887–1975) during the time when Chiang was also in an arranged marriage to Mao Fumei (1882–1939). In 1921, Chiang married Jennie. In 1927, Chiang divorced Mao Fumei and exiled Jennie—denying any association with the latter. In the busy year of 1927, Chiang also dropped Yao and married Soong Mei-ling ("Meiling", "Madame Chiang", 1897–2003).

Yao was a sing-song girl whom Chiang "took as his concubine" though at the time she "belonged to an elderly man who became jealous of her relationship" with Chiang. Once as she was serving bubbling-hot soup at a meal with both Chiang and the elderly patron present, the elder seized the bowl and emptied it onto her head while chiding her about the contacts with Chiang—an assault in which "the boiling liquid disfigured her, and ruined her career of entertaining men in teahouses."

Yao lived with Chiang for a time at a villa at 99 Daichengqiao Road in Suzhou. The spacious villa, later renamed Garden Hotel Suzhou, still stands and was used by the Communist Chinese government as an "official state guest house for leaders of the Party, the State and foreign countries" and visiting celebrities. It is now a hotel open to the general public.

Chiang entrusted Yao with the parenting of his adopted son Chiang Wei-kuo ("Wego", 1916–1997). Young "Wego" grew up to study military tactics in Nazi Germany where he commanded a Panzer unit before being recalled to China in 1938 where he was quickly promoted through ranks up to major general in the Kuomintang's National Revolutionary Army; he later was a senior officer in the Taiwanese Republic of China Armed Forces (until 1964 when he was moved to figurehead status after the Hukou Incident).

Yao died in Taiwan in 1966 at age 79.

References

Bibliography

1887 births
1966 deaths
Chiang Kai-shek family
People from Suzhou
Taiwanese people from Jiangsu
Spouses of Chinese politicians